Pochtovoye is a rural locality (a settlement) in Yemetskoye Rural Settlement of Kholmogorsky District, Arkhangelsk Oblast, Russia. The population was 205 as of 2010.

Geography 
Pochtovoye is located 145 km south of Kholmogory (the district's administrative centre) by road. Kalyi is the nearest rural locality.

References 

Rural localities in Kholmogorsky District